This is a list of flag bearers who have represented Azerbaijan at the Olympics.

Flag bearers carry the national flag of their country at the opening ceremony of the Olympic Games.

See also
Azerbaijan at the Olympics

References

Azerbaijan at the Olympics
Azerbaijan
Olympic